Emanuel Lazzarini (born January 20, 1987 in Casilda) is an Argentine professional footballer who plays for Nuova Gioiese.

Career

Lazzarini debuted on 8 September 2007 in a 0–0 draw with Club Atlético Lanús.

In 2008 Lazzarini moved to third division side Temperley playing 40 matches and scored 1 goal against Estudiantes de Caseros.

Lazzarini moved to Chile, joining Cobreloa on 6 August 2009. He made his debut in a match versus Universidad Católica in 2–0 defeat. He played 12 games and scoring 5 goals and that led him to take an offer from Mexican club of Liga de Ascenso, Correcaminos UAT.

After spells at Gimnasia y Tiro and Gimnasia y Esgrima, Lazzarini joined Club Atlético Atlanta in July 2013

Lazzarini played for Club Atlético Mitre in 2015, and then played for Chaco For Ever. He joined Unión de Sunchales in August 2017

Ahead of the 2019-20 season, Lazzarini joined Italian club ASD San Luca. A year later, in July 20202, Lazzarini moved to Siracusa. In September 2020, he signed with FC Sambiase. Two months later, at the end of October 2020, he then joined Roccella. In August 2021, he joined Tuttocuoio. In July 2022, he signed for Nuova Gioiese.

References

External links
 BDFA profile  

1987 births
Living people
People from Casilda
Argentine footballers
Argentine expatriate footballers
Association football forwards
Newell's Old Boys footballers
Club Atlético Temperley footballers
Correcaminos UAT footballers
Cobreloa footballers
Gimnasia y Tiro footballers
Gimnasia y Esgrima de Concepción del Uruguay footballers
Club Atlético Atlanta footballers
Club Atlético Mitre footballers
Chaco For Ever footballers
Unión de Sunchales footballers
Nuorese Calcio players
U.S. Siracusa players
A.S.D. Roccella players
A.C. Tuttocuoio 1957 San Miniato players
Ascenso MX players
Chilean Primera División players
Primera B Metropolitana players
Torneo Federal A players
Serie D players
Argentine expatriate sportspeople in Chile
Argentine expatriate sportspeople in Mexico
Argentine expatriate sportspeople in Italy
Expatriate footballers in Chile
Expatriate footballers in Mexico
Expatriate footballers in Italy
Sportspeople from Santa Fe Province